Xanthobacter flavus is a Gram-negative, nitrogen-fixing and facultatively autotrophic bacteria from the family of Xanthobacteraceae which has been isolated from turf podsol soil in Russia. Xanthobacter flavus has the ability to degrade phenol, oxalate and 1,4-dichlorobenzene.

References

Further reading

External links
Type strain of Xanthobacter flavus at BacDive -  the Bacterial Diversity Metadatabase

Hyphomicrobiales
Bacteria described in 1979